The East Division of the National Hockey League existed from 1967 until 1974 when the league realigned into two conferences of two divisions each. The division was reformed for the 2020–21 NHL season (and branded as the MassMutual East Division for sponsorship reasons) due to the COVID-19 pandemic.

In 1967, the NHL doubled in size, going from six teams to twelve. The Original Six, as the pre-1967 teams became retroactively known, were grouped into the East Division, while the expansion teams were placed into the West Division. This was done in order to keep teams of similar competitive strength in the same division, regardless of geographic distance, and to ensure playoff revenue for the new franchises. This competitive imbalance would lead to East Division teams winning the Stanley Cup in six of the seven years the league was divided into two divisions. Another consequence was that in 1969–70, the Montreal Canadiens, who had finished the season with 92 points (more than any team in the West Division), missed the playoffs – the only time between 1948–49 and 1993–94 that they did so.

When the NHL expanded again in 1970, the two new teams, the Vancouver Canucks and Buffalo Sabres, were placed into the stronger East Division. In an effort to create more balanced competition, the Chicago Black Hawks were transferred into the West Division. When the NHL expanded again in 1972, each division was given one of the expansion clubs, with the New York Islanders joining the East Division and the Atlanta Flames joining the West Division.

By 1974, another two teams (the Washington Capitals and Kansas City Scouts) entered the NHL, and as a result the league underwent a major overhaul. The East and West Divisions were renamed the Prince of Wales and Clarence Campbell Conferences, respectively, composed of nine teams each. The conferences were further divided into two divisions: the Norris and Adams Divisions for the Wales Conference, and the Patrick and Smythe Divisions for the Campbell Conference. Because the Conferences were not geographically based, the league opted to name the conferences and divisions after notable persons associated with the NHL.

The East and West Divisions were re-formed for the 2020–21 season as the result of the COVID-19 pandemic which forced the NHL to radically re-structure the League and to temporarily abolish the conferences. All eight East Division teams were members of the Eastern Conference in the 2019–20 season.

Division lineups

1967–1970
 Boston Bruins
 Chicago Black Hawks
 Detroit Red Wings
 Montreal Canadiens
 New York Rangers
 Toronto Maple Leafs

Changes from the 1966–67 season
 The East Division is formed as the result of NHL realignment
 All Original Six teams are placed in the division

1970–1972
 Boston Bruins
 Buffalo Sabres
 Detroit Red Wings
 Montreal Canadiens
 New York Rangers
 Toronto Maple Leafs
 Vancouver Canucks

Changes from the 1969–70 season
 The Chicago Black Hawks move to the West Division
 The Buffalo Sabres and Vancouver Canucks are added as expansion teams

1972–1974
 Boston Bruins
 Buffalo Sabres
 Detroit Red Wings
 Montreal Canadiens
 New York Islanders
 New York Rangers
 Toronto Maple Leafs
 Vancouver Canucks

Changes from the 1971–72 season
 The New York Islanders are added as an expansion team

After the 1973–74 season
The league was reformatted into two conferences with two divisions each. The Boston Bruins, Buffalo Sabres and Toronto Maple Leafs moved to the Adams Division. The Detroit Red Wings and Montreal Canadiens moved to the Norris Division. The New York Islanders and New York Rangers moved to the Patrick Division, while the Vancouver Canucks moved to the Smythe Division.

2020–21
 Boston Bruins
 Buffalo Sabres
 New Jersey Devils
 New York Islanders
 New York Rangers
 Philadelphia Flyers
 Pittsburgh Penguins
 Washington Capitals

Changes from the 2019–20 season
 Due to COVID-19 restrictions the NHL realigned for the 2020–21 season
 The East Division is reformed for the 2020–21 NHL season
 The Boston Bruins and Buffalo Sabres come from the Atlantic Division
 The New Jersey Devils, New York Islanders, New York Rangers, Philadelphia Flyers, Pittsburgh Penguins and Washington Capitals come from the Metropolitan Division

Changes from the 2020–21 season
 The division is dissolved as the league returned to previous two conference and four division alignment
 The Boston Bruins and Buffalo Sabres move to the Atlantic Division
 The New Jersey Devils, New York Islanders, New York Rangers, Philadelphia Flyers, Pittsburgh Penguins and Washington Capitals move to the Metropolitan Division

Division champions
 1968 – Montreal Canadiens (42–22–10, 94 pts)
 1969 – Montreal Canadiens (46–19–11, 103 pts)
 1970 – Chicago Black Hawks (45–22–9, 99 pts)
 1971 – Boston Bruins (57–14–7, 121 pts)
 1972 – Boston Bruins (54–13–11, 119 pts)
 1973 – Montreal Canadiens (52–10–16, 120 pts)
 1974 – Boston Bruins (52–17–9, 113 pts)
 2021 – Pittsburgh Penguins (37–16–3, 77 pts)

Season results

Stanley Cup winners produced
 1968 – Montreal Canadiens
 1969 – Montreal Canadiens
 1970 – Boston Bruins
 1971 – Montreal Canadiens
 1972 – Boston Bruins
 1973 – Montreal Canadiens

East Division titles won by team
Teams in bold were in the division in its most recent season.

References

 NHL History

National Hockey League divisions
Eastern Conference (NHL)